Anton Hoppe (February 12, 1889 – August 11, 1968) was a German politician of the Christian Democratic Union (CDU) and former member of the German Bundestag.

Life 
After the end of the Second World War Hoppe was among the founding members of the CDU in Westphalia and Recklinghausen. From 1946 to 1956 he served as District Administrator of the district of Recklinghausen. Hoppe was a member of the first and second appointed state parliament of North Rhine-Westphalia.

Subsequently, he was elected to the first federal parliament in the 1949 federal election by winning the direct mandate in the constituency of Recklinghausen-Land.

Literature

References

1889 births
1968 deaths
Members of the Bundestag for North Rhine-Westphalia
Members of the Bundestag 1949–1953
Members of the Bundestag for the Christian Democratic Union of Germany
Members of the Landtag of North Rhine-Westphalia